Frencq is a commune in the Pas-de-Calais department in the Hauts-de-France region of France.

Geography
A village situated some 10 miles (16 km) north of Montreuil-sur-Mer on the D113 road.

Population

Places of interest
 The eighteenth century Château de Rosamel
 Church of St. Martin, dating from the sixteenth century.

See also
Communes of the Pas-de-Calais department

References

Communes of Pas-de-Calais